Francis D. Gibson is an American politician and was a Republican member of the Utah House of Representatives representing District 65 from January 2009 to November 2021. His abrupt resignation in the middle of his term was unexpected, as he cited personal obligations.

Early life and career
Gibson earned his BS from Brigham Young University and his MSW from the University of Houston. He currently works as a health administrator and lives in Mapleton, Utah with his wife Sheila.

Political career
2014
Gibson was unopposed for both the Republican convention and the November 4, 2014 general election.

2012 
Gibson was unopposed for the June 26, 2012 Republican Primary and won the November 6, 2012 General election with 11,183 votes (86.7%) against Constitution candidate Ken Bowers.

2010 
Gibson was selected over a challenger by the Republican convention, and was unopposed for the November 2, 2010 General election, winning with 9,027 votes.

2008 
Gibson challenged District 75 incumbent Republican Representative Aaron Tilton and was selected by the Republican convention for the November 4, 2008 General election, which he won with 11,230 votes (74.9%) against Democratic nominee Douglas Baxter.

During the 2016 legislative session, Gibson served as the majority whip and served on the Executive Appropriations Committee, Public Education Appropriations Subcommittee, Legislative Management Committee, the House Education Committee and the House Special Investigative Committee. Gibson was elected House majority leader in 2018.

On October 26, 2021, Gibson announced he would resign his seat in the House of Representatives, citing career and family considerations.

2016 sponsored legislation

Gibson floor sponsored SB 71 Children's Justice Center Amendments, SB 102 High Coast Infrastructure Tax Credit Amendments, and SB 169 Olene Walker Housing Loan Fund Amendments.

References

External links
Official page at the Utah State Legislature
Campaign site
Francis Gibson at Ballotpedia
Francis D. Gibson at OpenSecrets

1969 births
21st-century American politicians
Brigham Young University alumni
Living people
Republican Party members of the Utah House of Representatives
People from Mapleton, Utah
Place of birth missing (living people)
University of Houston alumni